The first encirclement campaign against Jiangxi Soviet was a series of battles launched by the Chinese Nationalist Government intended to annihilate the Chinese Red Army, and destroy the Soviet. The communists later responded with the first counter-encirclement campaign at Central Soviet, also called by the communists as the first counter-encirclement campaign at Central Revolutionary Base, in which the Red Army successfully defended the Soviet Zone in the southern Jiangxi province against Nationalist attacks from November 1930 to January 3, 1931.

Prelude
The planning of the campaign was already in process in mid August 1930, as Chiang Kai-shek had directed He Yingqing, the commander of Wuhan headquarters, to hold a conference at Hankou on how to suppress the communists in Hunan, Hubei and Jiangxi provinces.  A decision was made to concentrate on military rather than political strategies, and to launch multiple attacks on the main communist base in Jiangxi Soviet. The plan was temporarily interrupted by the Central Plains War, but when Chiang's victory in this theatre was certain by October 1930, he immediately redeployed his troops in preparation for engaging the communists.

Nationalist strategy planned for the 1st phase
Chiang Kai-shek appointed the nationalist Jiangxi provincial governor and commander of the 9th Route Army, Lu Diping to organize the nationalist troops for redeployment. On November 2, 1930, Lu Diping mobilized the nationalist troops, totalling 7 divisions and 1 brigade into 3 columns, with reinforcements in the form of Chiang Kai-shek's troops from Hunan. The 19th Route Army departed from Wuhan by October 20, 1930. Lu Diping set a deadline of November 5, 1930, by which time the nationalist troops were to reach their designated deployment areas.

Commanders
Commander-in-chief: Chiang Kai-shek
Deputy commander-in-chief: Lu Diping
Frontline commander-in-chief: Zhang Huizan

Formations
The 1st Column:
13th Division deployed at Linchuan
18th Division deployed at Zhangshu
24th Division deployed on the northern banks of Gan River, northwest of Fengcheng, Jiangxi
The 2nd Column:
50th Division deployed at Western Mountain
14th Independent brigade deployed at Jingan
The 3rd Column:
5th Division deployed at Gaoan
77th Division deployed at Shanggao
Strategic reserve:
8th Division deployed at Nanchang

The nationalists totalled over 100,000 men and planned to crush the communists in the Linjiang region.

Communist strategy planned for the 1st phase
The communists originally disagreed on how to defend Jiangxi Soviet. In numerous debates, many supported the strategy of using the majority of the 40,000 strong Chinese Red Army to strike Nanchang and Jiujiang, in order to force the nationalists onto the defensive, thus abandoning the encirclement campaign. However, the general commissar of the Chinese Red Army, Mao Zedong opposed the idea, arguing that the numerically and technically inferior communist army was in no position to conduct an ambitious invasion into nationalist territory. Instead, it was decided that the communists should fight the enemy within Jiangxi Soviet itself, with the hope that the native population would support them. Mao Zedong finally prevailed and on October 30, 1930, at the Luofang Conference, it was agreed that the Chinese Red Army should cross the Gan River and defeat the enemy on the eastern shore.

First phase
Zhu De, the commander-in-chief of the Chinese Red Army, led the 3rd Legion, together with Mao. The 4th Army and the 12th Army of the 1st Legion crossed the Gan River, moving eastward to Xingan, Eternal Abundance, Chongren, and Yihuang, allowing the nationalists to occupy Qingjiang, Xingquan, Yellow Earth Street, Luofang, Xinyu, and Fenyi by early November 1930. Only the 3rd Army of the Chinese Red Army remained in the former communist region to harass the enemy, using guerrilla warfare, while Mao and Zhu De moved their troops toward Zhangshu and Linchuan. Fearing Zhangshu and Linchuan would be lost to the communists, Lu Diping ordered the 3rd Column to continue the attack on the western shore of Gan River, while the 1st and the 2nd Columns crossed the Gan River in pursuit of the major communist force.

After crossing the Gan, the nationalists succeeded in taking Xingquan, Chongren, Southern Town, Southern Abundance, Jishui, Lukou, Oil Field, Donggu and Dragon Hill by mid November 1930. From November 18–20, the nationalists took Ji'an, Jishui, Eternal Abundance, Yuean, Yihuang and Southern Town. By early December, the nationalist force was overstretched and halted their offensives to regroup and re-supply. Meanwhile, the communists planned their next move and also regrouped and re-supplied, first at Yellow Slope, Little Cloth and Luokou, and then moved to Pingtian, Firewood Gathering Hill, and Anfuyu by mid December. At the same time, the 20th Army of the Chinese Red Army acted as decoy in the Rich Field, Donggu and Dragon Hill regions to distract the enemy. A Communist counter-attack defeated the Nationalist force and drove them back. A stalemate ensued, with both sides using this period to plan and prepare for the next phase.

Kuomintang strategy planned for the second phase
Chiang Kai-shek reached Nanchang in early December 1930. He took the command and ordered the nationalist forces to attack Donggu in mid December. More nationalist troops were mobilized, with the 19th Route Army from Wuhan joining the battle, and the 49th Division, 56th Division and 2nd Independent Brigade attacking from Fujian. The nationalist forces by then had been boosted to a total of 11 divisions and two brigades, totalling more than 100,000 men. Lu Diping was named as Chiang's deputy, while Zhang Huizan, the commander of the 18th Division, was promoted to front line commander-in-chief. The Kuomintang troops slowly began their push towards their objectives.

Order of battle (nationalists)

77th Division attacking Anfu from Ji'an
49th Division and the 2nd Independent Brigade attacking Ruijin, Huichang 
34th brigade of the 12th Division defending Ganzhou
The 6th Route Army:
8th Division attacking Guangchan, Ningdu, Yudu from Yellow Slope and Southern Abundance
24th Division attacking Dongshao, Luokou, and Ningdu from Chinese Alligator Lake
56th Division attacking Stone City from Jianning
The 9th Route Army:
5th Division attacking Rich Field, Donggu from Ji'an
18th Division attacking Ancient County, White Sand and Donggu from Eternal Abundance
50th Division attacking Shaoxie, Tengtian, Dragon Hill and Donggu from Yuean
The 19th Route Army:
60th Division attacking Wanan from Pingxiang, Jiangxi
61st Division attacking Taihe from Pingxiang, Jiangxi

Communist strategy planned for the 2nd phase
The communists held a conference at Yellow Slope of Ningdu county in mid December 1930 to discuss their next move. Because of the inferiority in equipment suffered by the communists, Mao decided to concentrate his troops together, hoping to outnumber opposing forces during engagements. Smaller local communist forces would take advantage of the landscape to engage in guerilla warfare, in order to slow down enemy units and prevent them from linking up and reinforcing. Mao's idea was accepted, and the 35th Division of the 12th Army of the Chinese Red Army was sent to the Yue Creek region northeast of Xingguo county to distract the enemy, while the main force was concentrated at Yellow Slope and Matian in preparation for the coming battle.

Second phase
The stalemate ended on December 16, 1930, when the nationalists began the 2nd phase of their offensive. The 5th Division (later renamed the 28th Division) and the 18th Division reached Donggu on December 19 and December 20 respectively. However, heavy fog and poor communication prevented adequate coordination between the nationalist forces and the divisions mistook one another for the enemy, with both using artillery against the other. It was not until December 21 when the fog dissipated that the nationalists realized their mistakes, and by this time both sides had suffered hundreds of casualties.

From December 24–28, the communist forces managed to halt most of the nationalist advance:  
The nationalist 50th Division was stopped at Zhaoxie
The nationalist 60th Division was stopped at Wangan
The nationalist 61st Division was stopped at Taihe
The nationalist 24th Division was stopped at Caotaigang
The nationalist 8th Division was stopped at New Abundance
The nationalist 28th Division (renamed 5th Division) was stopped at Triple Craters
The nationalist 18th Division was stopped at regions near Yinfu and Nanlong

After the initial setback, the nationalist 50th Division continued their push, reaching River Origin, and prepared to take Little Cloth. Realising this, the communists attempted an ambush of the nationalist 50th Division twice, once on December 25, and again two days later. Both attempts failed – the nationalist troops refused to be drawn from their fortified positions on River Origin. The communists were forced to withdraw.

Third phase
On December 28, 1930, Lu Diping ordered the five nationalist divisions within the heart of Jiangxi Soviet to launch a general offensive toward the Yellow Slope, Little Cloth and Matian regions north of Ningdu. The nationalist 18th Division, under the command of Zhang Huizan, pushed toward Dragon Hill from Donggu. The communists attempted to incite local militia to stop the nationalist 50th Division at River Origin, the nationalist 24th Division at Luokou and the nationalist 8th Division at Head Slope, with the main force engaging the 18th Division.

On December 29, as the Chinese Red Army was on its way, the news of the fall of Dragon Hill to the nationalist 18th Division reached the communists. They devised a plan to trap the advancing nationalists with a pincer manoeuvre.

Fourth phase
On the morning of December 30, 1930, the 18th Division of the nationalist 9th Route Army began their push toward Five Gates Ridge from Dragon Hill, headed by the 52nd brigade. Around 09:00, the most important battle of the first counter-encirclement campaign began at Short Separation, east of Dragon Hill, with elements of the Chinese Red Army firing the first shot.

The first major battle
By noon of December 30, the entire 3rd Legion of the Chinese Red Army was engaged in the battle. Zhang Huizan, the commander of nationalist 18th Division, only devoted two more regiments in support of his 52nd brigade, under the mistaken belief that the enemy forces he had encountered were merely guerillas. By 15:00, Zhang Huizan was leading the charge of four regiments to clear the communist resistance, but was driven back. Taking advantage of this, the 4th Army and part of the 3rd Legion of the Chinese Red Army moved to cut off the nationalist 18th Division from Donggu and Yinfu, attacking Dragon Hill from behind. The majority of the 3rd Legion of the Chinese Red Army took Shanggu, cutting off the escape route of the nationalist 18th Division at Dragon Hill, and preventing any nationalist reinforcement from the north-west.

Realising they were trapped, morale amongst the nationalist ranks plummeted as they attempted an escape. By 16:00, the encirclement of the nationalist 18th Division was complete and the nationalist attempt to escape toward the north-west had been beaten back. The nationalist army quickly became unorganised, and by this point Zhang Huizan had insufficient control of his forces to arrange an orderly retreat or muster any counter-attack. He was eventually taken prisoner by the communist forces. By 18:00 the battle was over, the entire nationalist division having been wiped out.

Consequences
The complete destruction of the 18th Division of the nationalist 9th Route Army marked the immediate end of the nationalist assaults. The five nationalist divisions deep inside Jiangxi Soviet immediately started to retreat towards nationalist positions.

Fifth phase
The 50th Division of the nationalist 9th Route Army became the communists' next target as it began its retreat toward Dongshao from Southern Regiment on January 2, 1931. The communist leaders decided on the same day to pursue the enemy in three directions:

Left wing: The 3rd Legion of the Chinese Red Army would push to Head Slope, attacking Dongshao from the north.
Right wing: The main force of the 3rd Army of the Chinese Red Army would push to Tianying to engage the 24th Division of the nationalist 6th Route Army, preventing it from reinforcing the 50th Division of the nationalist 9th Route Army at Dongshao, while a portion of the 3rd Army of the Chinese Red Army would attack Dongshao from the east.
Central: The 12th Army of the Chinese Red Army would push to Southern Regiment and Linchi, attacking Dongshao from the west. The 4th Army of the Chinese Red Army would act as a strategic reserve, following the 12th Army.

The headquarters of the Chinese Red Army would move forward to Longtan to command the upcoming battle.

The second major battle
On January 3, 1931, communist forces on the left and in the center reached Dongshao and commenced their attack, succeeding in driving the enemy from Dongshao by 15:00. However, the communist force on the right failed to reach the battlefield, resulting in the successful escape of part of the nationalist force.

Consequences
The battle of Dongshao was the second important battle during the first counter-encirclement campaign. The communist victory marked the beginning of a general retreat by the nationalists, thus abandoning all of the regions newly gained during the campaign – the communist campaign had succeeded.

Outcome
The communist victory decimated four nationalist brigades totalling more than 15,000 troops, capturing more than 12,000 guns and artillery pieces. The success of the communist campaign marked the Chinese Red Army's transition from guerrilla warfare to mobile and conventional warfare, setting the pattern for the next three successful counter encirclement campaigns.

See also
Second encirclement campaign
Third encirclement campaign
Fourth encirclement campaign
Fifth encirclement campaign

Jiangxi Soviet, 1st Encirclment Campaign
Conflicts in 1930
Conflicts in 1931
1930 in China
1931 in China
Military history of Jiangxi